Sandy Bell's is a music pub in Edinburgh, Scotland. It is known locally and internationally for its live traditional music sessions, it was frequented regularly by folklorist Hamish Henderson prior to his death in 2002, indeed there is a bust of Henderson displayed above the bar. Originally known as 'The Forrest Hill Bar', the pub took its name from the building’s 1920s owner, a Mrs Bell, though the origin of the name “Sandy” is uncertain.

During the 1970s, an album entitled Sandy Bell’s Ceilidh was recorded on the premises, including performances by Aly Bain, Dick Gaughan and The McCalmans.

References

Pubs in Edinburgh